This is a list of prepared dishes characteristic of English cuisine. English cuisine encompasses the cooking styles, traditions and recipes associated with England. It has distinctive attributes of its own, but also shares much with wider British cuisine, partly through the importation of ingredients and ideas from North America, China, and India during the time of the British Empire and as a result of post-war immigration.

Ingredients that might be used to prepare these dishes, such as English vegetables, cuts of meat, or cheeses do not themselves form part of this list.

English dishes

See also
 List of English cheeses

Notes

References

Sources
 Ayrton, Elisabeth (1974) The Cookery of England: being a collection of recipes for traditional dishes of all kinds from the fifteenth century to the present day, with notes on their social and culinary background. London: Andre Deutsch.
 Ayrton, Elisabeth (1980) English Provincial Cooking. London: Mitchell Beazley.
 Grigson, Jane (1974) English Food. London: Macmillan. Enlarged edition 1979; later editions Ebury Press with foreword by Sophie Grigson.
 Dickson Wright, Clarissa (2011) A History of English Food. London: Random House. .
 Hartley, Dorothy (1954) Food in England. London: Macdonald (reissued: London: Little, Brown, 1996)
 Lehmann, Gilly (2003) The British Housewife. Totnes: Prospect Books.
 Panayi, Panikos (2010 [2008]) Spicing Up Britain. London: Reaktion Books. .

English dishes
Dishes
Dishes